Charles Edge (born February 23, 1950) is an American former basketball player. He played from 1973 to 1975 for the Memphis Tams and Indiana Pacers of the American Basketball Association (ABA). He was born in 1950 in Hamtramck, Michigan. He went to Northeastern High School in Detroit. Edge went to LeMoyne-Owen College. He was drafted both by the New York Knickerbockers in the 1973 NBA draft and by the Phoenix Suns in the 1972 edition of the draft, but never played for the Knicks and the Suns.

Edge taught, coached and mentored hundreds of kids for over 20 years at Detroit St. Martin de Porres High School until its closure in 2005. Edge worked for many years at Loyola High School in Detroit. In retirement, he has stayed involved with the school's basketball program.

References

External links
Career statistics at basketball-reference.com

1950 births
Living people
American men's basketball players
Basketball players from Detroit
Indiana Pacers players
LeMoyne–Owen Magicians basketball players
Memphis Tams players
New York Knicks draft picks
Northeastern High School (Michigan) alumni
People from Hamtramck, Michigan
Phoenix Suns draft picks
Small forwards
Sportspeople from Wayne County, Michigan